Chabbewal Assembly constituency (Sl. No.: 44) is a Punjab Legislative Assembly constituency in Hoshiarpur district, Punjab state, India.

Members of the Legislative Assembly

Election results

2022

2017

2012

References

External links
  

Assembly constituencies of Punjab, India
Hoshiarpur district